Microsoft Movies & TV (US only), or Microsoft Films & TV (Canada, UK, Ireland, Australia, and New Zealand), previously Xbox Video and Zune Video, is a digital video service developed by Microsoft that offers full HD movies and TV shows available for rental or purchase in the Video Store as well as an app where users can watch and manage videos from their personal digital collections stored locally. The service is available on all Xbox consoles beginning with Xbox 360, and all Microsoft Windows computers beginning with Windows 8. Movies & TV is also accessible on the web.

Zune Video Marketplace was released in 2006, and was replaced by Xbox Video on October 14, 2012. Renamed Movies & TV in 2015, the service now generally competes more directly with similar online video stores including iTunes Store, Google TV, and Amazon Video.

History 

Xbox Live Marketplace's original video store was replaced by Zune Marketplace on September 15, 2009.

At E3 2009, Microsoft announced their 1080p streaming video service, which allows users to stream video over an internet connection. This technology is a key part of Xbox Video for their video streaming service.

With the announcement of Xbox Music services which would replace the Zune Marketplace music service, speculation arose about "Xbox Video", a potential service that would offer movies and television series, because the term "music" in the name of the service gave the impression that Xbox Music will offer strictly music, thus excluding films and television series.

With the launch of Windows 10, Xbox Video appears under the name of Film & TV in the apps, with the shopping for the content merged into the Windows Store as a whole as part of Microsoft's universal apps initiative. However the name and branding of Xbox Video remains active on all the previous platforms and the official website.

On September 17, 2015, with a system update for the Xbox 360, the name of the app changed to reflect the new branding. The Xbox One app had also changed in a previous update.

After previously being linked with Movies Anywhere in the past, Microsoft Movies & TV announced that they would be rejoining the service on August 6, 2018.

Geographical availability

Supported formats 

The app in Windows 10 supports a number of formats, including:
.m4v
.mp4
.mov
.asf
.avi
.wmv
.m2ts
.3g2
.3gp2
.3gpp
.webm (on Windows 10 version 1809 and newer)

See also
Groove Music
Windows Media Player
Media Player (Windows 11)

References

External links

Microsoft Movies & TV on Microsoft Store

Microsoft websites
Universal Windows Platform apps
Online content distribution
Internet properties established in 2012
Windows components
Windows media players
Xbox
Xbox One software
Transactional video on demand